John B. Pinney (1806 – 1882) was a colonial agent of the American Colonization Society in Liberia from 1 January 1834 to 10 May 1835.

References

1806 births
1882 deaths
Agents and Governors of Liberia
Americo-Liberian people